Tube rice pudding is a Taiwanese dish consisting of a stir-fried glutinous rice mixture that is seasoned and steamed in a bamboo tube. Tube rice pudding is a cylindrical shape caused by the steaming process in a tube.  The dish is typically served with shiitake, minced pork, rousong, shallots, and sometimes eggs. With various flavouring in different parts of Taiwan, the dish is often complemented by sweet chili sauce and is often eaten at breakfast. The dish is considered one of the national dishes of Taiwan and was featured on the 40 of the best Taiwanese foods and drinks by CNN Travel.

See also

 Taiwanese cuisine
 Taiwanese turkey rice
 Coffin bread

References

Taiwanese rice dishes
National dishes
Taiwanese cuisine